"I Like" is a song by American singer-songwriter, actress and dancer Shanice, released as the third single from her third album, 21... Ways to Grow (1994), in August 1994. It samples "I'll Take You There" by the Staple Singers. A music video was produced to promote the single.

Critical reception
M.R. Martinez from Cash Box described the song as a "seductive ballad". Martin Johnson from Chicago Reader felt that on the album’s "most natural-sounding tracks", as "I Like", "she sounds self-assured and determined to elaborate her priorities." Pan-European magazine Music & Media commented, ""I Love" (I Love Your Smile) was what she once sang; now it's "I Like". This romantic tuning down is translated to a more streetwise swingbeat song. We not only like it, we love it".

Track listings
 12-inch single
A1. "I Like" (Masters at Work main mix)
A2. "I Like" (Masters at Work 54 dub)
B1. "I Like" (Kenny Dope main mix)
B2. "I Like" (Kenny Dope Troopapella)

 CD single
 "I Like" (album version edit)
 "I Like" (Masters at Work main mix)
 "I Like" (Kenny Dope main mix)
 "I Like" (Kenny Dope Vibes mix)

Charts

References

1990s ballads
1994 songs
1995 singles
Motown singles
Shanice songs
Songs written by Chris Stokes (director)
Songs written by Shanice